Friedrich Karl August, Prince of Waldeck and Pyrmont (25 October 174324 September 1812) was Prince of Waldeck and Pyrmont from 1763 to 1812.

Early life
He was the second son of Karl August, Prince of Waldeck and Pyrmont and Countess Palatine Christiane Henriette of Zweibrücken-Birkenfeld. He stayed on for one and a half years in Lausanne and made his Grand Tour through Italy and France.

Military career
Like his father and his brother Christian, he entered into foreign military services. In 1757 he was Imperial lieutenant colonel. In 1766 he became Major General and in 1772 lieutenant-general of the Dutch army. Working for the Netherlands already were three battalions from Waldeck, which had set up his father. Which Friedrich Karl August in 1767 added a fourth battalion.

Prince of Waldeck and Pyrmont
At the death of his father in 1763. In 1775 he went on a journey to England. In Waldeck, he undertook several modernization efforts. He promote the construction of roads, agriculture and commerce. Like his parents and brothers, he was very fond of the sciences. He left a written history of the Seven Years' War, and some biographical sketches. He encouraged the publication of the memoirs of his father on the campaigns 1745-1747.

Friedrich Karl August rented Waldecker troops to Great Britain in 1775 to fight in the American Revolutionary War. Waldeck contributed 1,225 men to the war, and lost 720.

The principality was divided 1805, his brother George was given Pyrmont, and Friedrich Karl August stayed with Waldeck. In 1807, he joined with the Confederation of the Rhine and was given a seat in the College of Princes of the Federal Assembly.

After his death in 1812, his brother George took over the government in Waldeck.

Ancestry

Notes and sources
Eintrag auf waldecker-muenzen.de (German)
Karl Theodor Menke: Pyrmont und seine Umgebung. Hameln, Pyrmont, 1840, S.65
L. Curtze: Geschichte und Beschreibung des Fürstentums Waldeck. Arolsen, 1850, S.619f.

1743 births
1812 deaths
People from Zweibrücken
People from Waldeck (state)
Princes of Waldeck and Pyrmont
House of Waldeck and Pyrmont